Tom Ahearne was an Irish rugby international. He won one cap in the 1899 Home Nations Championship helping Ireland to win the first game of their Triple Crown against England on 4 February 1899 played at home at Lansdowne Road. In the game, a good defence by Ireland gave them a 6–0 victory, their fourth successive win over the English.

Ahearne, from Blarney, was due to play for the Cork club, Dohenys, in the 1897 All-Ireland Senior Football Championship Final on the following day, 5 February 1899 but did not turn up.

References
IRFU Profile
Dohenys GAA website

Year of birth missing
Irish rugby union players
Ireland international rugby union players
Rugby union players from County Cork